Killhope Cross (elevation ) is a mountain pass in the English Pennines. The pass divides Weardale to the east and Cumbria to the west. The road over the pass, the (A689) from Hartlepool to Carlisle, Cumbria, connects the hamlet of Cornriggs in County Durham with the town of Alston, Cumbria.

The pass is named for a Grade-II-listed boundary cross at the highest point of the pass, described as "of uncertain date but possibly medieval".

See also
 List of highest paved roads in Europe
 List of mountain passes

References

External links
Profile on climbbybike.com

Killhope Cross
Stanhope, County Durham